Alana Hamilton Stewart (born May 18, 1945) is an American actress and former model. She has also used her maiden name, Alana Collins, and her names from her first marriage, Alana Collins-Hamilton and Alana Hamilton, professionally.

Early life
Born Alana Kaye Collins in San Diego, she grew up in Nacogdoches, Texas, and Houston, before heading to New York to become a model. She claimed to have grown up in poverty. Collins signed with Ford Models and traveled to Los Angeles for many television and commercial appearances.

Acting career
In the early 1970s, she began an acting career. Her first role was a bit part in the biographical film Evel Knievel which starred her then-husband, George Hamilton. She later appeared in small roles in television shows such as The Bionic Woman and Fantasy Island.

In 1995, she and ex-husband George Hamilton hosted their own syndicated talk show, George & Alana. The series was cancelled the following year.

In 2003, Stewart was a contestant in the ABC reality series I'm a Celebrity...Get Me Out of Here!.

From 2006 to 2009, Stewart filmed and produced an Emmy-nominated 90-minute documentary, "Farrah's Story", chronicling her friend and fellow model Farrah Fawcett's battle with cancer.

In 2012, she guest-starred in an episode of the Caruso|Portier web-series DeVanity as Claudia Muller, the mother of Lara Muller DeVanity and Dr. Portia Muller Roth.

Political activities
In 2014, Stewart, who is a Republican, endorsed her friend, Independent candidate Marianne Williamson, for U.S. Congress in California's 33rd district.

Stewart is a Trump supporter, having voted for him in 2016 and 2020. Unlike most of her colleagues in Hollywood, she opposes restrictions on gun ownership, aside from "stringent background checks". Post-divorce, she has lived alone and keeps her gun on her bedside table.

Stewart was a signatory of the bipartisan letter calling for Walmart to allow sales of the DVD and Blu-Ray discs of the 2019 political documentary No Safe Spaces. After Fox News called the 2020 presidential election in Arizona for Joe Biden, she was among the list of conservatives who ceased supporting the news channel and switched to Newsmax.

Personal life
She married actor George Hamilton in 1972. They had one child, a son named Ashley Hamilton. The couple divorced in 1975.

In 1979, she married singer Rod Stewart. The couple had a daughter, Kimberly, and a son, Sean. Alana and Rod Stewart divorced in 1984, but she retained his surname.

In the early 1990s, Stewart discovered she had the Epstein-Barr virus after having suffered from symptoms caused by the virus for two decades. In 1994, she began speaking out about her illness and revealed that she removed her breast implants because she felt they contributed to her illness.

Stewart was a close friend of Farrah Fawcett, who died in 2009 after a long battle with cancer, and she is the current President/CEO of the Farrah Fawcett Foundation. Her 2009 New York Times best seller My Journey with Farrah: A Story of Life, Love, and Friendship is dedicated to her journey with Fawcett.

In 2012, she published a book titled Rearview Mirror: A Memoir, detailing her upbringing, early career as a model, her marriages and subsequent divorces, and the deaths of her mother and Fawcett.

Filmography

References

External links
 

1945 births
Living people
Actresses from San Diego
People from Nacogdoches, Texas
Female models from California
American television actresses
American film actresses
Participants in American reality television series
Family of Rod Stewart